Koneru is a surname. It may refer to:

 Koneru Humpy (born 1987), chess grandmaster from India
 Koneru Ramakrishna Rao (born 1932), Indian educator and administrator
 Koneru Ranga Rao (1936–2010), Indian politician of the Congress party
 Koneru Lakshmaiah College of Engineering, an engineering college in Andhra Pradesh, India
 Koneru Nageswara Rao (1937-2016), Indian politician of the Telugu Desam Party 

Indian surnames